Shaymardan Nurimanovich Ibragimov (1899–1957) served as the second first secretary of the Communist Party of the Turkmen SSR, serving from 1926 until 1927. 

He was succeeded as first secretary by Nikolay Paskutsky.

References
World Statesmen

1899 births
1957 deaths
People from Nizhny Novgorod Oblast
People from Sergachsky Uyezd
Tatar people
Old Bolsheviks
Soviet military personnel of the Russian Civil War
Party leaders of the Soviet Union
Communist Party of Turkmenistan politicians
Recipients of the Order of the Red Banner